Cove Fort is a fort, unincorporated community, and historical site located in Millard County, Utah.  It was founded in 1867 by Ira Hinckley (the paternal grandfather of Gordon B. Hinckley) at the request of Brigham Young.  One of its distinctive features is the use of volcanic rock in the construction of the walls, rather than the wood used in many mid-19th-century western forts.  This difference in construction is the reason it is one of very few forts of this period still surviving.

Cove Fort is the closest named place to the western terminus of Interstate 70, resulting in  Cove Fort being listed as a control city on freeway signs, though the fort itself is historical and has no permanent population.

History

The site for Cove Fort was selected by Brigham Young because of its location about halfway between Fillmore, then the capital of the Utah Territory, and the nearest city, Beaver.  It provided a way station for people traveling the Mormon Road.  A town would have been constructed at the Cove Fort site, but the water supply was inadequate to support a sizable population.  Another key factor in the selection of the site was the prior existence of a wooden-palisade fort, Willden Fort, which provided shelter and safety for the work crews who constructed Cove Fort.

The fort is a square,  on each side.  The walls are constructed of black volcanic rock and dark limestone, both quarried from the nearby mountains.  The walls are 18 ft high and 4 ft thick at the base, tapering to 2 ft thick at the top.  The fort has two sets of large wooden doors at the east and west ends, originally filled with sand to stop arrows and bullets, and contains 12 interior rooms (six on the north wall and six on the south wall.)

As a daily stop for two stagecoach lines, as well as many other travelers, Cove Fort was heavily used for many years, often housing and feeding up to 75 people at a time.  In addition to providing a place to rest, a blacksmith/farrier resided at the fort, who shod horses and oxen, and also repaired wagon wheels.  With its telegraph office and as a Pony Express stop, it also acted as a regional communications hub.

Restoration
In the early 1890s, The Church of Jesus Christ of Latter-day Saints determined the fort was no longer required and leased it out, selling it to W.H. Kesler after the turn of the 20th century.  In 1988, the Hinckley family purchased the fort and donated it back to the Church.  The Church restored the fort, transported Ira Hinckley's Coalville, Utah, cabin to the site, constructed a visitor center, and reopened the fort as a historic site.  The site provides free guided tours daily, starting from about 8 am until one half-hour before sunset.

Transportation

The first highway to traverse Cove Fort was the Arrowhead Trail, which connected Salt Lake City with Los Angeles. When the U.S. Highway system was formed, this route became U.S. Route 91, and is today Interstate 15. When the Interstate Highway System was in the planning stages, planners noted no direct connection existed between the central United States and southern California. The result to fill this gap was a new freeway that would be built west from Green River, Utah, towards Cove Fort, along a path that used to be inaccessible by paved roads. Since that time, Cove Fort has also served as the western terminus of Interstate 70.

In 2004, the Federal Highway Administration was testing a new typeface, Clearview, designed to have improved readability at night with headlight illumination. One employee stated with the number of queries the department received about Cove Fort, the test was a success. The sign became so popular that after the test was over, federal authorities made arrangements with Maryland authorities to keep the sign permanently installed. The sign prompted a series of stories about Cove Fort to be published in the Baltimore area. Since that time, a small effort has been made by people in both states to lobby the Utah Department of Transportation to reciprocate by placing a sign at Cove Fort listing the distance to Baltimore.

See also
Fort Deseret, another fort, also NRHP-listed
Moyle House and Indian Tower, another fort, also NRHP-listed

References

Further reading

 History of Millard County (Lesson for ... / Daughters of Utah Pioneers) by Lou Jean S Wiggins
 Amazing But True Mormon Stories by Joan Oviatt
 Great Ghost Towns of the West by Tom Till and Teresa Jordan
 Utah Byways: 65 of Utah's Best Backcountry Drives by Tony Huegel
 The People: Indians of the American Southwest by Stephen Trimble
 Quilts and Women of the Mormon Migrations by Mary Bywater Cross
 Exceptional Stories from the Lives of Early Apostles by Leon R. Hartshorn
 Nineteenth-Century Mormon Architecture and City Planning by C. Mark Hamilton
 Mormon Architecture by Joseph Weston
 Mormon History by Ronald W. Walker, David J. Whittaker, and James B. Allen
 A New Zion: The Story of the Latter-day Saints by Bill Harris
 "LDS Restoration Project Gives Breath of New Life to Utah's Old Cove Fort" By Brian Giles, Feb. 6, 1992, Deseret News
 "Newly Restored Cove Fort Will Be Dedicated Saturday" By Reed L. Madsen, May 19, 1994, Deseret News
 "Visitors to Cove Fort think owl family's a hoot" By Reed L. Madsen, June 15, 1998, Deseret News
 "Cove Fort gets water boost" by Lynn Arave, July 20, 2002, Deseret News
 "Tools sought For Blacksmith Museum Exhibit" by Reed L. Madsen, April 4, 1993, Deseret News
 "Couple gets hitched — literally — on wagon trip" Sept. 16, 2001, Deseret News
 "Hinckley worked to remind and reconcile Mormons with their past" by Peggy Fletcher Stack, February 6, 2008, Salt Lake Tribune

External links

 Official web site of the Cove Fort Historic Site 
 Unofficial Cove Fort Historical Site
 Old Cove Fort from Utah.com
 Safety in High Walls and Civilization
 Cove Fort at the Millard County tourism site.
 Utah Forts: Cove Fort at Legends of America historic site.
 Cove Fort at Great Basin National Heritage Route website.
 

Pre-statehood history of Utah
Utah Territory
Landmarks in Utah
Buildings and structures in Millard County, Utah
Properties of the Church of Jesus Christ of Latter-day Saints
Waystations
The Church of Jesus Christ of Latter-day Saints in Utah
1867 establishments in Utah Territory
Museums in Millard County, Utah
History museums in Utah
Pony Express stations
Great Basin National Heritage Area
Historic American Buildings Survey in Utah
Forts on the National Register of Historic Places in Utah
Open-air museums in Utah
National Register of Historic Places in Millard County, Utah
Unincorporated communities in Millard County, Utah